Content Guru is a cloud communications provider based in Bracknell, UK. The company provides services in over 60 countries through its cloud Contact Centre as a Service solution, storm. These services are provided directly to customers and with partners such as Vodafone, KPN, and Rakuten. In April 2016, Content Guru received a Queen's Award for Innovation. Clients include the National Health Service, Serco, and TravisPerkins.

In response to the work it carried out for the National Health Service (NHS), Content Guru has won several awards, including the Crisis Management Innovation of the Year at the IT Europa Awards (2022), the Best Innovation in Customer Service at the ECCCSA Awards (2021) and the NextGen Technology Award at the Management Today NextGen Awards (2020).

History 
Content Guru is made up of a number of wholly-owned subsidiaries of Redwood Technologies Group across North America, Asia-Pacific and Europe. The vast majority of the revenue generated by Redwood Technologies Group comes from the delivery of cloud services through the Group's Storm infrastructure, provided and supported by Content Guru.

Content Guru was founded in 2005 and provides cloud-based customer engagement and customer experience services and cloud contact centre products. The company has offices in the US, Japan, Malaysia, Singapore, the UK, the Netherlands, Germany, Ireland and Italy.

In 2010, storm was used by ComRes on behalf of ITV News to provide live audience polling for the first televised election leaders' debate in the build-up to the UK 2010 General Election.

In 2013, Content Guru co-founded Berkshire Community Foundation (BCF)'s Business Philanthropy Club (BPC), which enables businesses in Berkshire to provide funding for grassroots organisations and projects in their local communities. Content Guru has been a sponsor of the Pride of Bracknell Forest Awards since 2016, along with its parent company Redwood Technologies. Content Guru supports several local and national charities, including the Red Cross, Lions International, Barnardo's, Kika Kinderfonds, Macmillan Cancer Support, Save the Children, the Soldiering on Awards, Thames Hospice, and Youthline.

In March 2017, the company announced that it would be delivering services to the United States. Later that year, Content Guru and Vodafone handled student enquiries for UCAS, the UK's higher education applications service.

In January 2018, a minority stake of Content Guru and its parent company, Redwood Technologies Group, was sold to Scottish Equity Partners in a £25 million cash deal.

In February 2018, Content Guru announced a partnership with Rakuten Communications to deliver services to Japan.

In 2019 Content Guru became a leader in the Gartner Magic Quadrant for CCaaS (Contact Centre as a Service), Western Europe.

In June 2019, Redwood Technologies Group acquired Weston Digital Technologies. This expanded Content Guru's product to offer screen recording and quality monitoring.

In February 2020, the Group was in the Sunday Times HSBC International Track 200. In 2021, the Group moved from 74th position on the International Track 200, to 21st.

In March 2020 Content Guru announced expansion in the US market, with the appointment of a new Business Development Manager in California, and the creation of a US channel partner program.

In early 2020 Content Guru undertook a survey on homeworking in the UK, showing the financial and productivity benefits of homeworking within the contact centre. During the pandemic, Content Guru helped its customers to move their contact centres to homeworking environments, for example, Jurys Inn and Rail Delivery Group.

In early July 2020 Content Guru announced that its product could now integrate with Microsoft Teams.

During the lockdown, Content Guru enabled Herts Urgent Care (HUC) to offer ad-hoc video consultations wherever possible, and to protect staff and patients from COVID-19.

In July 2020, Content Guru was named as a supplier in Crown Commercial Service's Spark Dynamic Purchasing System.

In August 2020 Content Guru won Frost & Sullivan's 2020 European Contact Center as a Service Technology Innovation Leadership Award.

In November 2020, Content Guru was positioned as a Challenger in the 2020 global Gartner Magic Quadrant for Contact Centre as a Service (CCaaS).

In April 2021, Content Guru's parent company Redwood Technologies acquired US-based Potomac Integration and Consulting (PIC).

In August 2021, Content Guru was positioned as a Challenger in 2021 Gartner® Magic Quadrant™ for Contact Centre as a Service (CCaaS).

In August 2022, Content Guru was positioned as a Challenger in the 2022 Gartner® Magic Quadrant™ for Contact Centre as a Service (CCaaS).

Controversy  
The company came under fire for its role in the Manchester Arena bombing of May 2017 during which Storm failed to operate. This resulted in those affected by the attack not being able to contact police or emergency services.

Vodafone had subcontracted its services out to Content Guru for providing the National Mutual Aid Telephony system. However, when they tried to use it they found an "inability to amend the recorded message and technical difficulties with the server. This suggests there was an inadequate level of knowledge or expertise within Vodafone or its sub-contractor Content Guru."

Vodafone and Content Guru continue their partnership, with Vodafone marketing Content Guru's product under the brand Vodafone Storm.

References 

Cloud computing providers
Companies based in Bracknell